Våra nya vingar is 1994 studio album from Swedish dansband Lotta Engbergs orkester.

Track listing

References

1994 albums